2,6-Dichlorophenol is a compound with formula C6H3Cl2OH.  It is one of the six isomers of dichlorophenol. It is a colorless solid.  Its pKa is 6.78, which is about 100x more acidic than 2-chlorophenol (8.52) and 1000x more acidic than phenol itself (9.95).

Preparation
It can be produced in a multistep process from phenol, which is converted to its 4-sulfonic acid derivative.  The resulting phenol sulfonic acid  chlorinates at the positions flanking the phenol. Hydrolysis releases the sulfonic acid group.

An alternative synthesis starts with the ethyl ester of 4-hydroxybenzoic acid, which chlorinates at the positions flanking the phenolic center.  Ester hydrolysis followed by decarboxylation affords 2,6-dichlorophenol.

References

Chloroarenes
Phenols